The First Battle of Höchstädt (the Second Battle of Höchstädt became known in English as the Battle of Blenheim) was fought on 20 September 1703, near Höchstädt in Bavaria, and resulted in a French-Bavarian victory under Marshal Villars against the Austrians under General Hermann Otto of Limburg Styrum. The battle was part of the War of the Spanish Succession (1701–1714) over who had the right to succeed Charles II as king of Spain.

Prelude
On 15 September, the main force of the Imperial Army under Louis William, Margrave of Baden-Baden had taken the free city of Augsburg, threatening Bavaria from the west. A force of men under Count Styrum, which Baden had left north of the Danube river, moved east and reached Höchstädt on 19 September. Villars and Maximilian II Emanuel, Elector of Bavaria, moved their army to intercept this force, ordering another French force of 7,000 men under d'Usson near Dillingen to attack from the rear.

The battle
The French plan almost failed as d'Usson attacked too soon, and his army, inferior in numbers, was pushed back by Limburg Styrum.
However, Villars and Maximilian Emanuel arrived just in time, falling upon the Imperial army before it could adjust its positions.
It was only thanks to the tremendous resistance of the rearguard under Leopold I, Prince of Anhalt-Dessau that Limburg Styrum managed to save his army and reach Nördlingen.

The Imperials lost 12,000 men, many of them taken prisoner, 37 cannons, and the entire supply train. The French and Bavarians lost 1,000 men.

A year later, the Second Battle of Höchstädt was fought, usually known in English as the Battle of Blenheim. (This should not be confused with the 1800 Battle of Höchstädt during the French Revolutionary Wars, which is also known as the Second Battle of Höchstädt.)

References

External links
 Maps of the battle 

Battle of Hochstadt
Battles involving France
Battles involving Bavaria
Battles involving Austria
Battles of the War of the Spanish Succession
1703 in Europe
1703 in the Holy Roman Empire
18th century in Bavaria
Battles in Bavaria